Emosi Kauhenga (born 27 April 1981 in Folaha, Tonga) is a rugby union footballer. He plays at lock.

In 2007 he was named to Tonga's Rugby World Cup squad. In 2009 he was selected for a team to play Ireland.

References

External links
IRB

1981 births
Living people
Rugby union locks
Tongan rugby union players
People from Tongatapu
Tonga international rugby union players
Tongan expatriate rugby union players
Expatriate rugby union players in Japan
Tongan expatriate sportspeople in Japan
Black Rams Tokyo players